Susie Shellenberger is an American speaker, author, and magazine editor.

Career

Shellenberger has a bachelor's degree from Bethany Nazarene College (1978). She taught high school speech and English teacher, and was a youth pastor. She created Brio, Focus on the Family's publication for teen girls in 1989, and presented "realistic role models" while using magazines such as Seventeen magazine for ideas. She edited the magazine throughout its 19 years of publication. In 2001, she founded Brio and Beyond for girls aged 16 to 19. For seven years she co-hosted a national weekly call-in radio show for teens, called Life on the Edge Live, also produced by Focus on the Family. When Focus on the Family ceased publication of Brio, Shellenberger joined forces with marketing agency Premier Studios to create SUSIE Magazine, a monthly print magazine, in 2009. Shellenberger shared the messages of the SUSIE brand with young people by speaking before music concerts played by ZOEgirl.

She also led teens on mission trips to different countries, including Brazil, Panama City, and the Caribbean. She has been featured as a keynote speaker for the Girls of Grace conferences with Point of Grace and has also traveled as a opening act for singer Rebecca St. James. Shellenberger has written multiple books, starting with There's a sheep in my mirror in 1985. Her books have been reviewed by several newspapers and by School Library Journal.

Selected publications

Honors and awards 
Olivet Nazarene University awarded her with their Centennial Award in 2000, and awarded her its Lifetime Achievement Award in 2010.

References

External links 
Susie Magazine
Premier Studios

Living people
American motivational speakers
Women motivational speakers
American Christian clergy
Year of birth missing (living people)
American women writers
American women editors